Pachybaris is a genus of flower weevils in the beetle family Curculionidae. There are about five described species in Pachybaris.

Species
These five species belong to the genus Pachybaris:
 Pachybaris ludoviciana Casey, 1920
 Pachybaris porosa LeConte, 1876
 Pachybaris rudis Wickham, 1912
 Pachybaris stolida Faust & J., 1896
 Pachybaris xanthoxyli Linell

References

Further reading

 
 
 

Baridinae
Articles created by Qbugbot